Glenfield Park is a county park in Montclair and a small part in Glen Ridge, both in Essex County, New Jersey. It shares a name with the nearby Glenfield Middle School. Glenfield Park is part of the Essex County Park System.

Creation

In 1910, the land for the park was given by the township of Montclair to the Essex County Park system.  The Park was then designed by the Olmsted Brothers, a famous landscape design firm.

Overview

Glenfield Park, from the Maple Avenue side, looks like a collection of athletic fields with paths  and trees between.  There is more however. Behind the Playgrounds, Baseball diamonds, and tennis courts there is a forest with tall trees and thick ground cover.  Through it goes paved and unpaved trails, and also a stream, Toney's Brook.  This area is home to much wildlife and is the only natural terrain of its caliber for miles around. The railroad is discreetly hidden behind the brook.

The area containing the brook, known as the Glen, is overgrown and is hard to navigate. There are a few small arch bridges which cross the brook and connect walking paths, but one has been cordoned off and closed due to its deterioration.

Location
Glenfield Park is in southeastern Montclair, near the town line with Glen Ridge.  It is Bordered in the south by Woodland Avenue, and in the West by Maple Avenue. On the East it is Bordered by NJ Transit's Montclair-Boonton Line.  It's also  bordered in the  Northeast by Bloomfield Avenue, the main road in Montclair.

Facilities

 2 basketball courts
 3 Tennis Courts
 2 softball／baseball diamonds
 community center with game rooms， meeting rooms, craft rooms， kitchen, and restrooms
 2 children's playgrounds
 footpaths
 Football field
 Event Gazebos
 Fitness course
 nature trail.  	
 Grass Roots program

References

External links

 Glenfield Park - Essex County Park System

County parks in New Jersey
Glen Ridge, New Jersey
Montclair, New Jersey
Parks in Essex County, New Jersey